Agustín Aranzábal Alkorta (born 15 March 1973) is a Spanish former professional footballer who played as a left-back.

His main asset was his crossing ability, and he played almost exclusively with Real Sociedad, which he represented for more than ten years, appearing in 353 competitive matches.

Aranzábal was also a Spanish international, and played for the country in one World Cup and one European Championship.

Club career
Aranzábal was born in Bergara, Gipuzkoa. A product of Basque Country giants Real Sociedad's youth system, he first appeared with the main squad on 21 February 1993, in a 5–1 away loss against Deportivo de La Coruña. After three full seasons with the reserves, he went on to be an undisputed first-choice for one decade, for instance playing 32 games for the 2002–03 runners-up.

In July 2004, still in La Liga, Aranzábal moved to Real Zaragoza, where he was used mainly as a backup to Paraguayan Delio Toledo. He retired after a small stint with amateur side CD Vera in the Canary Islands, with ex-Spain international (also a Real Sociedad teammate) Javier de Pedro also starting the campaign but being promptly dismissed.

In early 2010, Kitchee SC from Hong Kong signed Aranzábal alongside compatriot Albert Celades. They both appeared with the club at the 2010 Lunar New Year Cup, a mid-season exhibition tournament.

International career
Aranzábal earned 28 caps for Spain. His debut was on 7 June 1995 in a UEFA Euro 1996 qualifier against Armenia in Seville, and he was a participant at the 1998 FIFA World Cup and Euro 2000.

Aranzábal also appeared for the quarter-finalists at the 1996 Summer Olympics.

Personal life
Aranzábal's father, José Agustín, was also a footballer. A midfielder, he too played for Real Sociedad and Spain.

Honours
Spain U21
UEFA European Under-21 Championship runner-up: 1996

References

External links

1973 births
Living people
People from Bergara
Spanish footballers
Footballers from the Basque Country (autonomous community)
Association football defenders
La Liga players
Segunda División B players
Real Sociedad B footballers
Real Sociedad footballers
Real Zaragoza players
Kitchee SC players
Spain under-21 international footballers
Spain under-23 international footballers
Spain international footballers
1998 FIFA World Cup players
UEFA Euro 2000 players
Olympic footballers of Spain
Footballers at the 1996 Summer Olympics
Basque Country international footballers
Spanish expatriate footballers
Expatriate footballers in Hong Kong
Spanish expatriate sportspeople in Hong Kong